Omorfoula, Ομορφούλα (el) or Litseno  is an anonymous  Greek folkloric tune.

References

Greek music
Greek songs
Domna Samiou songs